South Clear Lake is a lake in the U.S. states of Indiana and Michigan.

South Clear Lake was so named on account of the clear character of its water; the name was prefixed with "south" in order to avoid repetition with Clear Lake, also in Berrien County.

References

Landforms of St. Joseph County, Indiana
Lakes of Berrien County, Michigan